The 2017 CS U.S. International Figure Skating Classic were held in September 2017 in Salt Lake City, Utah. It was part of the 2017–18 ISU Challenger Series. Medals were awarded in the disciplines of men's singles, ladies' singles, pair skating, and ice dance.

Entries 
The International Skating Union published the list of entries on 21 August 2017.

 Withdrew before starting orders drawn
 Ladies:  Haley Yao,  Stephanie Yuung-Shuh Chang
 Ice dance:  Robynne Tweedale / Joseph Buckland,  Anastasia Galyeta / Avidan Brown

Senior results

Men

Ladies

Pairs

Ice dance

References

Citations

External links 
 
 2017 U.S. International Figure Skating Classic at the International Skating Union

2017
2017 in figure skating
2017 in sports in Utah
Sports in Salt Lake City
CS U.S. International